The Hager House is a historic home located at South Bend, St. Joseph County, Indiana.  It was designed by architects Austin & Shambleau and built in 1910, and is a -story, Shingle Style dwelling.  It has a gambrel roof with front eaves and a large gable roof dormer.  It features a front porch with a bellcast roof supported by brick end piers and fluted Doric order columns.

It was listed on the National Register of Historic Places in 1985.

References

Houses on the National Register of Historic Places in Indiana
American Craftsman architecture in Indiana
Bungalow architecture in Indiana
Shingle Style architecture in Indiana
Houses completed in 1910
Buildings and structures in South Bend, Indiana
Houses in St. Joseph County, Indiana
National Register of Historic Places in St. Joseph County, Indiana